Stephen Edward Foster (30 September 1946 – 25 January 2018) was an Australian singer-songwriter and musician from Murray Bridge, South Australia.

Career
Foster recorded his first solo single in 1963 under the K-Bee Label while in high school. He was attending South Australian School of Art when he began a residency at The Catacombs Coffee Lounge in Hackney. He lived there for many years, even acting as caretaker. He appeared regularly on Adelaide TV including Adelaide Tonight, as well as ABC, ADS7 and Saturday mornings on Channel 10's InTime.

Although most of his career focused on solo work, Foster led bands including Inkase, Alcheringa, Head First, Beautiful Dreamer, Steve Foster Band, Limited Edition, Blackwood County and OCQ. With Blackwood County, he toured outback South Australia and opened the 2006 Outback Fringe. He was the opening act on the Brian Cadd & the Bootleg Family Australian tour 1972–1973. He performed in The Mount Lofty Rangers, which was a collection of Adelaide musicians including the late Bon Scott, before he joined AC/DC. In 1971, Foster was the only Adelaide act to play The Myponga Festival, which was Adelaide's answer to Woodstock.

In September 1972 Foster released his first solo album Coming Home in a Jar on the Bootleg Label, under Ron Tudor's record label, Fable Records. In 1995, Forever Blue, was co-written with Graeham Goble, recorded by Little River Band in 1986 on the album No Reins, the last album recorded with John Farnham. It became a huge hit in Europe. It eventually reached the Top 10 where it stayed for 12 weeks.

Foster performed across Australia and wrote and recorded over 500 songs. Foster was selected by Arts SA to represent Adelaide in the first " Made in Adelaide" promotion at the 2016 Edinburgh Fringe Festival in Scotland where his 7 sold-out concerts ensured media attention and an invite to return.

Foster was active in charity work; he volunteered two days a week at the South Australian Aviation Museum and worked on the sailing ketch Falie, helping to restore a part of Australia's maritime history. Foster was an Australia Day Ambassador and travelled every year to visit councils across South Australia to perform and explain what it means to be a proud Australian.

Steve Foster was inducted into the SA Music Hall of Fame, posthumously, at his memorial Tribute Concert at the Governor Hindmarsh Hotel where fellow musicians flew in from across Australia to perform his music and honour his legacy.

Steve Foster died on 25 January 2018 in Adelaide, South Australia, four years after being diagnosed with lung cancer.

Associated artists
Brian (Sam) Sampson
Inkase
Resurrection
Black Watch
Bob Dylan
D'Naz
The Mount Lofty Rangers
Bon Scott
Peter Head
Brian Cadd's Bootleg Family
Phil Manning
Ross Ryan, Mike McClellan, Doug Ashdown
Alcheringa
Steeleye Span
Stephen Foster Band
Head First
Richard Clapton
Limited Edition (Beautiful Dreamer-renamed)
The Byrds
Cyndi Boste
Broken Voices
Michael Cooper
The Tenants
Sitting Ducks
Graeham Goble
John Farnham
John Farnham & Little River Band
Little River Band (current)
Hank Williams
Donovan
Blackwood County
The OCQ
Jenny Loftes
Chris Goodall

Awards
1968: South Australia New Faces-winner
1968: Australian National New Faces-runner up
1973: 5KA Rock Award-The Most significant contribution to Recording in South Australia & Australia for:Coming Home in a Jar Album
1995: Forever Blue, co-write with Graeham Goble becomes huge European hit with John Farnham & LRB.
2006: I Guess I'm Gonna Need Somebody Else  track 10 on the CD Steve Foster & Blackwood County, is awarded: APRA/SACCM SA Country Song of the Year (Traditional) 2006
2008: Appointed an Australia Day Ambassador by Australia Day Council
2011: Finalist in International Song Competition for Mike Pinder (UK, ex Searchers)
2016: Chosen as a South Australian representative for Made in Adelaide Showcase at Edinburgh Fringe Festival. Performed 7 sold-out concerts.
2018: Inducted into the SA Music Hall of Fame

Discography
1963: Mary-Ann original A side Poison Ivy B side with The Barons 45 rpm K-Bee Label. Murray Bridge
1967: Inkase (Live from channel 10) 3 track EP
1972: Coming Home in a Jar released on the Bootleg label LP under Ron Tudor's Fable Records.
1974: Alcheringa (folk-rock) recorded AAV, Melbourne, 10 track album 
1979: Limited Edition CD
1984: The Stephen Foster Band 2 track single
1996: Big Storm Comin'  12 track CD
1998: The Tenants-Ordinary 3 track P CD
1999: The Tenants-Live 5 track EP CD
2004: Three New Songs acoustic duo with Max Wright CD
2006: Steve Foster & Blackwood County Limited Edition Outback Fringe Tour 12 track CD
2009: Ships & Sailors & Songs of the Sea 11 track CD
2011: The OCQ, 13 track CD 
2013: Independent No.1’s Vol 3 WOA Records
2014: Independent No.1’s Vol 4 WOA Records
2015: GOA Global Chillout Zone Vol 6 WOA Records 
2016: A Life in Music 1972-2012 released on Steve Foster Music label, 12 track retrospective CD (August)

Gallery

References

External links

Steve Foster & Blackwood County Bluegrass Ensemble (MySpace)
Steve Foster & The OCQ (MySpace)
Steve Foster & Blackwood County Bluegrass Ensemble (Triple J Unearthed)
Steve Foster & The OCQ (Triple J Unearthed)

1946 births
2018 deaths
Australian musicians
Deaths from cancer in South Australia
Deaths from lung cancer
People from Murray Bridge, South Australia
Musicians from South Australia
Australian singer-songwriters
20th-century Australian male singers
21st-century Australian singers